Francisco "El Tano" Bertocchi Fernández  (born 5 August 1946) is a retired Uruguayan football midfielder who played for several clubs in Latin America, including Peñarol, Liga Deportiva Universitaria de Quito, Liverpool de Montevideo and Club de Futbol Monterrey.

Career
Bertocchi received 10 caps for the Uruguay national football team, scoring once.

Bertocci was the top scorer in the Ecuadorian League in 1969 with L.D.U. Quito, the following year he was joint top scorer in the Copa Libertadores with Argentine Oscar Más.

References

External links
 Profile 

1946 births
Living people
Uruguayan footballers
Uruguay international footballers
Uruguayan expatriate footballers
Association football midfielders
Liga MX players
Peñarol players
L.D.U. Quito footballers
Liverpool F.C. (Montevideo) players
C.F. Monterrey players
Tampico Madero F.C. footballers
Expatriate footballers in Mexico
Expatriate footballers in Ecuador
L.D.U. Quito managers
Uruguayan expatriate sportspeople in Ecuador
Uruguayan football managers
C.D. El Nacional managers